The Piano Sonata No. 2 in G major by Paul Hindemith was composed in 1936. A typical performance lasts 13 minutes. The shortest of his three piano sonatas, Hindemith thought of this sonata as a sonatina, and its writing is considered to be accessible even to amateurs.

Structure 
The sonata is in three movements:

References 

Compositions by Paul Hindemith
Hindemith
Compositions in G major